Revenue stamps of Jersey refer to the various adhesive revenue or fiscal stamps issued by the States of Jersey for use on the island of Jersey, a British Crown dependency. The island has issued general-duty revenues, along with issues for Justice, Property Guarantee Fund and Social Assurance.

Jersey revenues are still in use.

See also
Postage stamps and postal history of Jersey
Revenue stamps of Guernsey
Revenue stamps of the Isle of Man
Revenue stamps of the United Kingdom

References

Economy of Jersey
Jersey